Rainbow's End is the second full-length album by American Christian rock band Resurrection Band, released in 1979.

Recording history
Resurrection Band continues in its Led Zeppelin-inspired rock vein with this record. This release is significant for the inclusion of "Afrikaans," the first anti-apartheid song ever released by an American rock band, one full year before Peter Gabriel brought the issue to listeners' attention with "Biko."  Although the band was greatly pleased with this album, that sentiment was not shared by the record label, and Rainbow's End would be the band's last release for Star Song Records.

Track listing 

The title track was never played live until Resurrection Band's final concert at the Cornerstone Festival in 2000.

Personnel 

 Glenn Kaiser – lead and background vocals, electric guitars
 Wendi Kaiser – lead and background vocals
 Stu Heiss – electric and acoustic guitars, piano, organ, Moog synthesizer, "Heiss Box" guitar synthesizer
 Jim Denton – bass guitar, acoustic guitar
 John Herrin – drums
 Roger Heiss – percussion
 Tom Cameron – harmonica
 Kenny Soderblom – saxophone, recorder

Production
 Resurrection Band – producer, mixing
 Gary Loizzo – engineer
 Stu Heiss – engineer, mixing
 Roger Heiss – engineer

Album design
The gatefold LP for Rainbow's End originally came in a slipcase cover with die-cut windows on either side of the angel. Depending on which side was inserted, the windows revealed either heavenly clouds, or stained-glass windows.

References

Resurrection Band albums
1979 albums